This is a list of seasons played by Maccabi Haifa Football Club in Israeli and European football, from 1949 (first edition of the Israeli League.) to the most recent completed season. It details the club's achievements in major competitions, and the top scorers for each season. Top scorers in bold were also the top scorers in the Israeli league that season. Records of minor cup competitions, such as the Lilian Cup and the Israel Super Cup are not included due to them being considered of less importance than the State Cup and the Toto Cup.

The club has won the League Championship thirteen times, the State Cup six times and the Toto Cup four times. The club has never been out of the top two divisions of Israeli football.

History
Maccabi Haifa Football Club was established in 1913 in the port city of Haifa. It was a small, struggling club that spent most of its time bouncing between the Liga Leumit and the lower leagues. The club was given a bye to the final of a 1923 competition called The Hebrew Cup, which it lost to Maccabi Nes Tziona 0–2. In 1942, the club reached the State Cup final, but was humiliated 12-1 by Beitar Tel Aviv in the final, which is the club's worst defeat ever. In 1962, the club won its only honour until the 80s, when the team defeated Maccabi Tel Aviv 5-2 in the State Cup final. In 1963 they reached the final again, but failed to defend their title losing to arch-rivals Hapoel Haifa 1-0.

Seasons

Table correct as of 28 May 2022

Key

 P = Played
 W = Games won
 D = Games drawn
 L = Games lost
 F = Goals for
 A = Goals against
 Pts = Points
 Pos = Final position

 R32 = Round 1
 R16 = Round 2
 QF = Quarter-finals
 SF = Semi-finals

 UCL = UEFA Champions League
 UEL = UEFA Europa League
 UCP = UEFA Cup
 ECW = UEFA Cup Winners' Cup
 INT = UEFA Intertoto Cup

 Group = Group stage
 QR1 = First Qualifying Round
 QR2 = Second Qualifying Round
 QR3 = Third Qualifying Round
 QR4 = Fourth Qualifying Round

Notes and references

Maccabi Haifa F.C.
 
Maccabi Haifa
Maccabi